Mihai Plătică (born 15 March 1990) is a Moldovan footballer who plays as a midfielder for Petrocub Hîncești in the Moldovan National Division. He also holds Russian citizenship as Mikhail Ivanovich Platika.

Club career
On 31 January 2020, he signed with FC Kyzylzhar in Kazakhstan.

On 9 February 2021, he returned to Moldova, signing a three-year contract with Petrocub Hîncești.

International goal
Scores and results list Moldova's goal tally first.

Personal life
His younger brother Sergiu Plătică is also a football player.

References

External links

 Profile at academia.md
 

1990 births
Living people
Moldovan footballers
Moldovan expatriate footballers
Association football midfielders
FC Sfîntul Gheorghe players
FC Academia Chișinău players
FC Rubin Kazan players
FC Neftekhimik Nizhnekamsk players
FC Zimbru Chișinău players
FC Rostov players
FC Shinnik Yaroslavl players
FC Sokol Saratov players
FC Milsami Orhei players
FC Kyzylzhar players
CS Petrocub Hîncești players
Russian Premier League players
Russian First League players
Moldovan Super Liga players
Kazakhstan Premier League players
Moldovan expatriate sportspeople in Russia
Moldovan expatriate sportspeople in Kazakhstan
Expatriate footballers in Russia
Expatriate footballers in Kazakhstan
Moldova under-21 international footballers
Moldova international footballers